Johanna is a small locality on the coast of Victoria, Australia located west of Cape Otway in the Colac Otway Shire. It is named after the schooner Joanna that was wrecked at the mouth of the Johanna River on 22 September 1843.

History
Johanna Post Office opened on 1 November 1913 and closed in 1967.

The surfing beach at Johanna is a long stretch of beach breaks, or beach and reef, noted for its power and its reputation for rapid jumps in size (doubling over the space of just a few hours).  The Bells Beach Surf Classic competition has been moved from Bells Beach to Johanna on occasions when the surf at Bells has been flat (such as in 2003 and 2010).  The westerly-facing beach at Johanna picks up swells that miss Bells and the Surf Coast.

References

External links
Johanna - Town information

Towns in Victoria (Australia)
Coastal towns in Victoria (Australia)
Otway Ranges
Surfing locations in Victoria (Australia)